Eija Inkeri (1926–2012) was a Finnish stage and film actress.

Selected filmography
 Aaltoska orkaniseeraa (1949)
 Kvinnan bakom allt (1951)
 The General's Fiancée (1951)

References

Bibliography 
 Kari Uusitalo. T. J. Särkkä: legenda jo eläesään. WSOY, 1975.

External links 
 

1926 births
2012 deaths
Finnish stage actresses
Finnish film actresses
People from Kuopio